Pierre Sipriot (16 January 1921 in Paris – 13 December 1998 in Fontenay-lès-Briis) was a 20th-century French journalist and principal biographer of Henry de Montherlant.

A journalist for France Culture, Pierre Sipriot produced the  radio program from 1966.

He was twice a recipient of prizes awarded by the Académie française: the Prix Broquette-Gonin in 1973 and the Prix de la critique in 1977.

Works 
1953: Montherlant par lui-même, Le Seuil
1982: Montherlant sans masque Tome I, L'Enfant prodigue, Robert Laffont
1990: Montherlant sans masque Tome II, Écris avec ton sang
1979: Montherlant Dessins, preface by Pierre Sipriot, Copernic
1983: Henry de Montherlant - Roger Peyrefitte, Correspondance (1938-1941), présentation and notes by R. Peyrefitte and Pierre Sipriot, Robert Laffont
1979: Album de la Pléiade: Montherlant, bibliothèque de la Pléiade, éditions Gallimard
1987: Pierre Sipriot (dir.), Brasillach et la génération perdue, Éditions du Rocher,  - Hommage collectif (Jean Anouilh, Maurice Bardèche, Jean Guitton, Fred Kupferman, Dominique Desanti, Thierry Maulnier and Jean-Marc Varaut).
1988: Montherlant et le suicide, Éditions du Rocher
1997: Le Désastre De L'Europe, 1914-1918, Romain Rolland, Paris, Bartillat

Bibliography 
 "Le procès du Montherlant sans masque de Pierre Sipriot", Droit et Littérature, double issue of the review ACTES, n° 43-44, April 1984, présented and edited by Régine Dhoquois and Annie Prassoloff.

External links 
 Pierre Sipriot on the site of the Académie française
 Henry de Montherlant et la sagesse@ on the site of the Revue des deux mondes
 Francis Jammes par Paul Claudel et Pierre Sipriot (1948) on YouTube

Winners of the Prix Broquette-Gonin (literature)
20th-century French journalists
Journalists from Paris
French biographers
French radio producers
Prix Goncourt de la Biographie winners
1921 births
1998 deaths